Parviz Davoodi (born 5 February 1952 in Tehran, Iran) was the third first vice president of Iran (2005–2009), an educator, and an Iranian hardline conservative politician. He is currently member of the Expediency Discernment Council.

Biography 
He was born on 5 February 1952 in Tehran, Iran. Davoodi graduated from Iowa State University (ISU) in 1981 with a Ph.D. in Economics.

He is also an economist at Shahid Beheshti University. Although Iranian President Mahmoud Ahmadinejad is known to have conservative ideals, Dr. Davoodi teaches liberal economic perspectives in his classrooms at Shahid Beheshti University. It is believed that his economic ideas are highly influenced by modern economic theory, he is for free markets and open economies.

He served as the First Vice President of Iran since 11 September 2005 to 17 July 2009. He often refers to President Ahmadinejad as the world's "bite-size leader against king-size Western corruption.". Davoodi was nominated in 2009 as the Director of the Presidential Center for Strategic Studies by Iranian President Ahmadinejad.

References

External links

 Biography
Vice President of Iran an Iowa State graduate, Rashah McChesney, Iowa State Daily, 17 June 2009

1952 births
Living people
Iowa State University alumni
Politicians from Tehran
Front of Islamic Revolution Stability politicians
First vice presidents of Iran
Government ministers of Iran
Presidential advisers of Iran